Chad Faust (born July 14, 1980) is a Canadian actor, singer, film producer, film director, and screenwriter best known for his role as Kyle Baldwin in The 4400. He currently resides in Los Angeles, California.

Biography
Faust starred in Bang Bang You're Dead, a film about high school shootings. Faust was also seen in All I Want, which features him sporting a long mullet, cheap sunglasses, and a spiked collar alongside Elijah Wood, Franka Potente, and Mandy Moore. Among Faust's other credits are multiple independent films, the CTV television series So?, as well as guest spots on NBC's Skate and Heroes; DreamWorks' Taken; and WB's Black Sash and Smallville.

Faust was later seen as "Dean Withers," a Christian teenager who is sent to The Mercy House to "cure" his homosexuality, in the feature film Saved!, starring alongside a collection of young stars including Macaulay Culkin, Mandy Moore, Jena Malone, Patrick Fugit, and veterans Martin Donovan and Mary-Louise Parker. He also starred together with Rosario Dawson in Descent, in 2006.

Faust has written, directed and produced six short films and one feature. We Ran Naked, a feature film about an author living in the shadow of his successful first novel, premiered in 1999, when Chad was just 19. As a solo recording artist, Faust has released two CDs under the independent label, Zotzman Music.

In early 2019, it was announced Faust had begun production on his directorial debut Girl, with actress Bella Thorne cast as the lead.

Filmography

Film

Television

References

External links

PopGurls Interview: Chad Faust

1980 births
Living people
Canadian male film actors
Canadian male television actors
Canadian expatriates in the United States
Film directors from Victoria, British Columbia
21st-century Canadian screenwriters
Film producers from British Columbia
Male actors from Victoria, British Columbia
Musicians from Victoria, British Columbia
Writers from Victoria, British Columbia
21st-century Canadian male actors
21st-century Canadian male singers
Canadian expatriate male actors in the United States
Canadian male screenwriters